Ballymoe is a barony in County Roscommon, Republic of Ireland.

Etymology
Ballymoe barony is named after Ballymoe town, County Galway; the name means "mouth of the ford of Mogh"; Mogh is a legendary figure linked to Queen Medb.

Geography
Ballymoe barony is located in the centre of County Roscommon, north of the River Suck.

History

Donamon Castle is located in Ballymoe; it was a centre of the Ó Fiannachta (O'Feenaghty). Also in this area were the O'Concheanainn (O'Concannon), chiefs of the Uí Díarmata.

There was originally a single large barony, named Ballymoe and part of County Galway. Later, about one-fifth of the barony's area — the part north of the River Suck — was given to County Roscommon.

Richard Malone, 1st Baron Sunderlin (c. 1738 – 1816) was a landowner in the area. It was the site of agrarian trouble in the 1840s.

References

Baronies of County Roscommon